Song of the Plough, later re-released with the alternative title Country Fair, is a 1933 British drama film directed by John Baxter and starring Stewart Rome, Rosalinde Fuller and Allan Jeayes. The screenplay concerns an English farmer who is saved from financial ruin when his dog wins at a sheepdog trials.

The film was a quota quickie made for distribution by the American company MGM. It was filmed at Shepperton Studios with location shooting on a Sussex farm. It received a poor review from The Observer critic C. A. Lejeune, but she was forced to withdraw this following many letters in support of the film. The film proved unexpectedly popular when it was released.

Cast
 Stewart Rome as Farmer Freeland 
 Rosalinde Fuller as Miss Freeland 
 Allan Jeayes as Joe Saxby  
 Hay Petrie as Farmhand  
 Kenneth Kove as Archie  
 Jack Livesey as Squire's Son  
 Edgar Driver as Barber  
 James Harcourt as Doctor 
 Freddie Watts as Bandsman 
 Albert Richardson as Singer

References

Bibliography
 Chibnall, Steve. Quota Quickies: The British of the British 'B' Film. British Film Institute, 2007.
 Low, Rachael. Filmmaking in 1930s Britain. George Allen & Unwin, 1985.
 Wood, Linda. British Films, 1927-1939. British Film Institute, 1986.

External links

1933 films
British drama films
British black-and-white films
1933 drama films
1930s English-language films
Films directed by John Baxter
Films shot at Shepperton Studios
Films set in England
Films shot in England
1930s British films
Quota quickies